This is a list of records and statistics related to the Greek association football Club PAS Giannina F.C.

Player records and statistics

Most Valuable Players

European competitions record 

During the 2016–17 season, PAS Giannina competed on the UEFA Europa League qualifying rounds for the first time in the club's history. PAS Giannina finished 6th on the 2015–16 Super League Greece, which enabled him to participate, on the Second qualifying round.

PAS Giannina first european game

On the 21st of July 2016, PAS Giannina faced Odds BK in a full Zosimades Stadium with a total attendance of 5.615 spectators and a one of a kind atmosphere created by the fans, who completed a legendary pre game parade towards the stadium, with thousands of fans and hooligans loudly signing chants. Players were greeted into the stadium by an unprecedented atmosphere which could be heard throughout the whole locality.

PAS Giannina captain Alexios Michail opened the score from inside the box after a corner kick taken by Noé Acosta on the 7th minute. PAS Giannina had total control of the game, and in the 31st minute Fonsi Nadales doubled his team lead with a great volley after a perfectly executed cross by Nikos Karanikas. On the second half, the goalkeeper Alexandros Paschalakis with a presice volley across the whole length of the pitch, spotted Dimitrios Ferfelis who took advantage of the opposition's defenders error and sprinted towards goal with Acosta trailing. Ferfelis' shot got blockeded by the goalkeeper, who couldn't handle the ball, and got served for Noé Acosta who scored to form the final score.

On the 2nd leg, about 500 PAS Giannina fans traveled to Norway to support their team. The away side managed to concede no goals on the first half, but conceded 3 goals on the second half, and the game was led to extra time. However, the Epirus side managed to score after a remarkable dribble fooling the opposition defenders from Christopher Maboulou, who let the ball pass beside him after a pass from Karanikas, to reach Leonardo Koutris who beat the goalkeeper, and formed the final score of 3-1 after extra time, and eventually led PAS Giannina to the Third qualifying round for the first time in the club's history.

Balkans Cup

Honours and distinctions
Over the years, PAS has competed in the Super League for a total of 25 seasons (plus 2020–21). The club has never won the Super League or the Greek Cup, but it has won lower division titles throughout its history and represented Greece in the 1979–80 and 1993–94 Balkans Cup tournaments. During its history in the Super League, the club finished 3 times in the 5th position (1975–76, 1977–78, 2012–13 seasons) and 3 times in the 6th position (1979–80, 2014–15, 2015–16 seasons).

On January 31, 2007, PAS clinched a spot in the Greek Cup semifinals by virtue of an extra-time goal from Evangelos Kontogoulidis before a hostile crowd in Karaiskakis Stadium. With an aggregate score of 3–2, PAS Giannina also is the first ever lower division club that eliminated Olympiacos from the Greek Cup tournament.

The most famous player to have donned the blue and white PAS Giannina's jersey in recent years is defender Giourkas Seitaridis, who later played for Panathinaikos, FC Porto, Dynamo Moscow, and Atlético Madrid as well as the triumphant Euro 2004 Greece squad.

Domestic competitions
Super League (First Division)
 1975–76, 5th place: 30 games, 36 points, 15 wins, 6 draws, 9 defeats, goals 40–33
 1977–78, 5th place: 34 games, 38 points, 14 wins, 10 draws, 10 defeats, goals 45–39
 1979–80, 6th place: 34 games, 37 points, 14 wins, 9 draws, 11 defeats, goals 50–44
 2012–13, 5th place: 30 games, 44 points, 12 wins, 8 draws, 10 defeats, goals 28–24
 2014–15, 6th place: 34 games, 53 points, 13 wins, 14 draws, 7 defeats, goals 47–33
 2015–16, 6th place: 30 games, 42 points, 12 wins, 6 draws, 12 defeats, goals 36–40
 2021–22, 6th place: 36 games, 46 points, 12 wins, 10 draws, 14 defeats, goals 34–42
Super League 2 (Second Division)
 Champions (4): 1973–74, 1984–85, 2001–02, 2019–20
Gamma Ethniki (Third Division)
 Champions (1): 1997–98
Greek Cup
 Semi-Finals (3): 2006–07, 2009–10, 2020–21

International
'Balkans Cup Runners-Up (1): 1993–94

Individual Player & Coach awardsBest Manager in Greece Giannis Christopoulos: 2012–13
 Giannis Petrakis: 2014–15Best Young Player Charis Charisis: 2014–15Best Goalkeeper Markos Vellidis: 2014–15
 Yuri Lodygin: 2021–22Top Scorer of Greek Cup Georgios Pamlidis: 2019–20 (together with Dimitris Pelkas)
 Pedro Conde: 2017–18 (together with Aleksandar Prijović, Lazaros Christodoulopoulos)
 Georgios Saitiotis: 2006–07 (together with Jozef Kožlej)Top Scorer of Beta Ethniki'
 Ibrahima Bakayoko: 2010–11

Super League Team of the Year
  Leonardo Koutris: 2016–17 
  Markos Vellidis: 2014–15
  Yuri Lodygin: 2021–22
  Giannis Kargas: 2021–22
  Manolis Saliakas: 2021–22

References

records and statistics
Association football club records and statistics